A Very Severe Cyclonic Storm is the third highest category used by the India Meteorological Department (IMD) to classify tropical cyclones, within the North Indian Ocean tropical cyclone basin between the Malay Peninsula and the Arabian Peninsula. The category was introduced alongside the Super Cyclonic Storm category during 1999 in order to replace the previously used Severe Cyclonic Storm with Core of Hurricane Winds. However, it was bifurcated during 2015, when the IMD introduced a new Extremely Severe Cyclonic Storm category. There have been at least eight storms that have attained such an intensity. The most recent super cyclonic storm was Cyclone Kyarr in 2019 North Indian Ocean cyclone season.

Background
The North Indian Ocean tropical cyclone basin is located to the north of the Equator, and encompasses the Bay of Bengal and the Arabian Sea, between the Malay Peninsula and the Arabian Peninsula. The basin is officially monitored by the India Meteorological Department's Regional Specialized Meteorological Centre in New Delhi, however, other national meteorological services such as the Bangladesh and Pakistan Meteorological Department's also monitor the basin.

The Very Severe Cyclonic Storm category was introduced during 1999 alongside Super Cyclonic Storms in order, to replace the previously used Severe Cyclonic Storm with Core of Hurricane Winds. However, during 2015 the category was bifurcated, after the IMD introduced a new Extremely Severe Cyclonic Storm category.

Systems

Climatology

References

External links
RSMC New Delhi

Very severe cyclonic storms
NIO VSCS